Stockholmspolisens IF is a Swedish swim team from Stockholm, Sweden founded in 1912. Stockholmspolisens IF also has departments in team handball, basketball, football, judo and, triathlon. The swimming department offers swimming, diving, masters swimming and water polo.

Swimming

Notable swimmers
Therese Alshammar
Per Holmertz
Mikaela Laurén
Anders Grillhammar

Waterpolo

The team roster for the 2015–16 season:

Staff:
 Head coach:  Gunnar Johansson (water polo)
 Manager:  Hans Lundén

Goalkeepers:
  Olaani Hedeta
  Mehdi Malek

Field players:
  Henrik Sjöberg (centre back)
  Richard Ericson (centre back)
   Maxime Gazzo (centre back)
  Oskar Thiel (C) (all round)
  Mattias Renholm (driver)
  Andreas Hartzell (driver)
   Pierdomenico Polito (driver)
  Mark Conrad (driver)
   Michael Lawson (driver)
  Vicente Tirado (driver)
  Johan Lundén (centre forward)
  Kim Hansson (lefthanded / centre forward)
  Vedran Preloznik (lefthanded)

References

External links
Stockholmspolisens IF's official homepage 

Swimming clubs in Sweden
Sports clubs established in 1912
Sporting clubs in Stockholm
1912 establishments in Sweden
Water polo clubs in Sweden